Sokolniki  is a village in the administrative district of Gmina Kołaczkowo, within Września County, Greater Poland Voivodeship, in west-central Poland. The Church of St. James the Greater stands in the village.

The village has a population of 660.

References

Villages in Września County